Sparks Middle School may refer to:
 Sparks Middle School - Sparks, Nevada - Washoe County School District
 Sparks Middle School - La Puente, California - Hacienda La Puente Unified School District

See also
 2013 Sparks Middle School shooting (related to the Nevada school)